Rhinoceros is the 1968 debut album of Rhinoceros. The fold-out cover artwork by Gene Szafran shows a brightly colourful, beaded rhinoceros.

Track listing
 "When You Say You're Sorry" (Alan Gerber) - 3:51
 "Same Old Way" (John Finley) - 2:02
 "Apricot Brandy" - instrumental (Danny Weis, Michael Fonfara) - 1:57
 "That Time of the Year" (Alan Gerber) - 4:11
 "You're My Girl (I Don't Want to Discuss It)" (Beth Beatty, Dick Cooper, Ernie Shelby) - 4:38
 "I Need Love" (Larry Williams) - 4:23
 "I've Been There" (Alan Gerber, John Finley) - 4:24
 "Belbuekus" (Danny Weis, John Finley) - 2:25
 "Along Comes Tomorrow" (Alan Gerber) - 4:37
 "I Will Serenade You" (John Finley) - 3:19

Personnel
Rhinoceros
 John Finley - vocals (tracks 1,2,4-8,10)
 Alan Gerber - vocals (tracks 1,6-9), piano
 Danny Weis - guitar, piano
 Doug Hastings - guitar
 Michael Fonfara - organ
 Jerry "The Bear" Penrod - bass
 Billy Mundi - drums, percussion
Technical
John Haeny - engineer
Gordon Anderson - executive producer
William S. Harvey - art direction, design concept
Gene Szafran - cover illustration
Guy Webster - photography

References

1968 debut albums
albums produced by Paul A. Rothchild
Elektra Records albums